The third season of Unforgettable an American police procedural drama television series originally aired on CBS from June 29, 2014, through September 14, 2014.

Cast and characters

Main
 Poppy Montgomery as Det. Carrie Wells
 Dylan Walsh as Lt. Al Burns
 Jane Curtin as Dr. Joanne Webster
 Dallas Roberts as Eliot Delson
 Tawny Cypress as Det. Cherie Rollins-Murray
 James Hiroyuki Liao as Det. Jay Lee

Recurring
 Boris Kodjoe as Agent Francis Simms

Episodes

Production

Development
Unforgettable was renewed for a third season of 13 episodes on September 27, 2013. Unforgettable was canceled on October 10, 2014. In February 2015, reported that Unforgettable was picked up by A&E for a fourth season.

Broadcast
Season three of Unforgettable premiered on June 29, 2014.

Reception

Ratings

References

External links
 

2014 American television seasons
3